Five Fingers is a 2012 South Korean television series starring Ju Ji-hoon, Chae Shi-ra, Ji Chang-wook and Jin Se-yeon. It aired on SBS's Saturdays and Sundays at 22:00 (KST) time slot, from August 18 to November 25, 2012, for 30 episodes.

Synopsis

Set in South Korea, the drama's first 4 episodes focus on the childhoods of Yoo Ji-Ho and Yoo In-Ha. 12-years old Yoo Ji-Ho lived with his adoptive grandmother. One day, during a thunderstorm, his grandma is killed, after being run over by a mysterious black car. Afterwards, Yoo Ji-Ho is invited into the family of Yoo In-Ha.

11-years old Yoo In-Ha is the son of a wealthy CEO of a piano company. He is an overly cocky piano prodigy, winning all of the competitions he enters. After his father introduces Yoo Ji-Ho is introduced as the elder son of Yoo In-Ha's father, Yoo In-Ha begins to feel threatened by Yoo Ji-Ho, who has lots of musical talent.

Chae Yeong-rang, Yoo In-Ha's mother, is forced to accept Yoo Ji-Ho as her son. She was extremely unhappy about this, especially after discovering that her husband plans to hand the company down to Yoo Ji-Ho, instead of Yoo In-Ha. After arguing with her husband, she unintentionally struck her husband down onto the ground, causing his head to bleed. Fearing that she killed her husband, she fled, but discovers that the house is on fire, unintentionally caused by her mother in law, who fell asleep after lighting the candles on a birthday cake. The mother in law rushed out of the house, begging a deaf and mute street dessert vendor to help her rescue her two grandsons.

The street dessert vendor's daughter was friends with both Yoo Ji-Ho and Yoo In-Ha. Her name is Hong Da-mi. Yoo Ji-Ho taught the girl her first piano piece, while Yoo In-Ha gave her official piano lessons.

Realizing that her son is still upstairs, she rushed upstairs to rescue him the fire. She unintentionally rescued Yoo Ji-Ho instead of Yoo In-Ha, believing that Yoo Ji-Ho was her actual son, because he was wearing the bunny pajamas that she gave to her actual son earlier. After realizing that she rescued the other son, she attempted to reenter the building, but was stopped by firefighters.

Yoo In-Ha sustained major injuries, caused by the fire, but was thankfully saved by the street desert vendor. Unfortunately, the man died, after a chandelier fell on top of him. Yoo In-Ha discovered that his fingers are ruined, due to the fire. His mother ordered the doctor to have a skin-graft surgery, which would allow Yoo In-Ha to play the piano once more. After the surgery, Yoo In-Ha discovered that he could no longer move his pinky finger, resulting in much anguish. Yoo In-Ha attempted to commit suicide by jumping off the hospital building, but was saved by his older brother, Yoo Ji-Ho.

After being interrogated by police about the fire, Chae Yeong-rang blamed the street vendor for the fire, claiming that he was a thief. The street vendor's family is shamed and forced to move away.

14 years later, Yoo Ji-Ho and Yoo In-Ha meet Hong Da-mi again, competing for her love. Who will win?

Cast

Main
Ju Ji-hoon as Yoo Ji-ho
Kang Yi-seok as young Ji-ho
Chae Shi-ra as Chae Yeong-rang
Ji Chang-wook as Yoo In-ha 
Kim Ji-hoon as young In-ha
Jin Se-yeon as Hong Da-mi
Kim Sung-kyung as young Da-mi

Supporting
Jeon Mi-seon as Song Nam-joo
Jung Eun-woo as Hong Woo-jin
Lee Hae-in as Jung So-yeol
Jo Min-ki as Yoo Man-se
Na Moon-hee as Min Ban-wol
Jeon No-min as Kim Jung-wook
Cha Hwa-yeon as Na Gye-hwa
Jang Hyun-sung as Choi Seung-jae
Jeong Jun-ha as Louis Kang

Controversy
Accusations of plagiarism were made by the author of novel Blood Rhapsody, which the production denied.

Ham Eun-jung was initially cast as the female lead Hong Da-mi, and she had already appeared in the promotional teasers and stills, as well as attended the press conference. But due to the negative publicity stemming from T-ara's bullying controversy, the production fired her and replaced her with Jin Se-yeon. Ham filed a lawsuit against the producers, and the Corea Entertainment Management Association (CEMA) issued a boycott against the production company Yein E&M (now known as Jidam Inc.). In February 2013 Yein E&M issued a formal apology for firing Ham without notice.

Ratings

International broadcast
 The series aired in Japan on TBS beginning July 24, 2013. 
 In Vietnam, the series aired on VTVCab7 D-Drama from July 17, 2013. 
 In Thailand, the series aired on 3SD in a network of Channel 3 under the title ทำนองรักทำนองชีวิต (thảnxng rạk thảnxng chīwit; literally: Rhythm Love, Rhythm Life) beginning June 28, 2016.
The series also aired in 2013 in Hong Kong.

References

External links
  
 

2012 South Korean television series debuts
2012 South Korean television series endings
Seoul Broadcasting System television dramas
Korean-language television shows
Television shows involved in plagiarism controversies
South Korean musical television series
South Korean melodrama television series
South Korean romance television series
Television shows written by Kim Soon-ok